Fitzroy Ernest Wilson (18 November 1951 – 2 November 2021) was a Jamaican reggae singer who found fame as a member of the Clarendonians before working as a solo artist.

Biography
Wilson formed the Clarendonians in 1963 with Peter Austin, the duo going on to become one of the most popular groups of the ska and rocksteady era, and having several Jamaican number one hits. Wilson embarked on a solo career in 1967, releasing the "Money Worries" single. Further singles followed, with "Undying Love", "Storybook Children" and "If I Were a Carpenter" in 1968 (all produced by Coxsone Dodd), "Private Number" (for Joe Gibbs) and "Freedom Train" (for Lee "Scratch" Perry - one of the first Jamaican singles ever to be released in stereo) in 1969. In 1969, he got back together with sometime Clarendonian Freddie McGregor in the duo 'Ernest Wilson & Freddy', releasing the singles "Sentimental Man" and "Love Makes the World Go Round", and later "What You Gonna Do About It" and "Let Them Talk". One of Wilson's biggest international hit singles, "Let True Love Be", (1976), was done alongside Harold Butler & Four Corners. It was featured on Butler's 1978 album, The Butler Did It. Wilson was also briefly a member of The Techniques.

He contributed backing vocals to tracks by Beres Hammond, Inner Circle, Jimmy Reid, Jimmy Riley, Johnny Osbourne and Kiddus I. He was also a multi-instrumentalist, having played piano on the Umoja album as part of the DEB Music Players, bass guitar on Gregory Isaacs' Cool Ruler album, and guitar on several recordings including tracks by Tinga Stewart and Kiddus I.

Wilson died in Kingston on 2 November 2021, at the age of 69.

Albums
Love Revolution (1986) Natty Congo
Promise Me (1987) Techniques
Undying Love (1992) VP
Still Love You (2007) Love Injection

References

External links
Ernest Wilson discography at ReggaeID
 

1951 births
2021 deaths
Jamaican bass guitarists
Jamaican reggae musicians
People from Clarendon Parish, Jamaica